Sara Bertoli (born 5 May 1979 in Rome) is an Italian modern pentathlete. She won two medals, silver and bronze, in the women's relay event at the 2002 and 2004 World Championships in San Francisco, California, United States and in Warsaw, Poland, respectively. Bertoli is a member of the modern pentathlon team for Gruppo Sportivo Fiamme Azzurre, and is coached and trained by Luigi Filipponi.

Bertoli qualified for the 2008 Summer Olympics in Beijing, where she competed in women's modern pentathlon, along with her teammate Claudia Corsini. During the competition, Bertoli struggled to attain a higher position in the early rounds, with poor scores in pistol shooting, in one-touch épée fencing, and in freestyle swimming. She managed to improve her performance in the show jumping segment, but dropped to thirty-fourth position, when her horse Naonao repeatedly knocked off numerous obstacles, and suddenly fell her into the ground. In the end, Bertoli finished the event with cross-country running in thirty-second place, for a total score of 4,956 points.

References

External links
  (archived page from Pentathlon.org)
 NBC 2008 Olympics profile

1979 births
Living people
Italian female modern pentathletes
Olympic modern pentathletes of Italy
Modern pentathletes at the 2008 Summer Olympics
World Modern Pentathlon Championships medalists
Sportspeople from Rome
20th-century Italian women
21st-century Italian women